is a resort hotel located in Tōyako, Abuta, Hokkaidō, Japan. Managed by The Windsor Hotels International, the Windsor Hotel Toya Resort & Spa was the main conference site of 34th G8 summit, which was the fifth G8 summit to take place in Japan.

History 
The Hotel Apex Tōya opened in December, 1993. To manage the hotel, the Windsor Hotels International was established in July, 1997, and the hotel was renamed the Windsor Hotel Tōya. 

The Hokkaido Takushoku Bank, which had financed the hotel, went bankrupt in November 1997, and the management of the hotel was discontinued for lack of funds. In 2000, Tokachi Urban Properties, a local real-estate company, purchased the land and building of the hotel, and extensive renovation of the building was done during the following year. 

After the building was redone, the hotel was opened as The Windsor Hotel Toya Resort & Spa on June 1, 2002. In the same year, the hotel was acceded to the Leading Hotels of the World, and the Windsor Hospitality Institute, a school for hotel clerks, was established. Secom, a security company, has owned the hotel between 2000 and 2014, when the company sold it to Meiji Shipping, a Japanese shipping company.

Overview 
The Windsor Hotel Toya Resort & Spa is located on the top of Mount Poromoi which is 625 m high, providing a scenic view of Lake Tōya. The hotel is affiliating with three-star Michelin restaurants in France, and affluent tourists from Hong Kong and Singapore have frequently visited.

On April 23, 2007, the site was announced to be the venue of 34th G8 summit, and the entrance and the second floor were remodeled. Between July 1 and July 10 of 2008, the hotel suspended its regular business due to the G8 summit.

See also
 List of G8 summit resorts

References

External links 

 The Windsor Hotel Toya Resort & Spa official website
 The Leading Hotels of the World
 Hokkaidō Tōyako Summit Preparation Council 2008

Hotels established in 1993
Hotels in Hokkaido
Tourist attractions in Hokkaido
Destination spas
1993 establishments in Japan